NGC 691 is an unbarred spiral galaxy located in the constellation Aries. It is located at a distance of circa 120 million light years from Earth, which, given its apparent dimensions, means that NGC 691 is about 130,000 light years across. It was discovered by William Herschel on November 13, 1786.

NGC 691 features a multiple ring structure, with three rings recognised in the infrared, with diameters of 1.03, 1.67, and 2.79 arcminutes. When imaged in H-alpha, the galaxy appears patchy. One supernova has been observed in NGC 691, SN 2005W. It was discovered by Yoji Hirose in unfiltered CCD frames taken on Feb. 1.442 UT with a 0.35-m f/6.8 Schmidt-Cassegrain reflector. The supernova was located 56" east and 1" south of the center of NGC 691 and at the time of the discovery had an apparent magnitude of 15.2. Spectrographic observations indicated it was a type Ia supernova about a week before maximum. The peak magnitude of the supernova was 14.3, on February 10.759.

NGC 691 is the foremost member of a galaxy group known as the NGC 691 group. Other members of the group include IC 163, NGC 678, NGC 680, NGC 694, IC 167, and NGC 697.

Gallery

References

External links 

NGC 691 on SIMBAD

Unbarred spiral galaxies
Aries (constellation)
0691
01305
06793
Astronomical objects discovered in 1786
Discoveries by William Herschel